Borogontsy (Boroğon) is a rural locality (a selo), the administrative centre of and one of three settlements, in addition to Myndaba and Tomtor, in Myuryunsky Rural Okrug of Ust-Aldansky District in the Sakha Republic, Russia in addition to being the administrative centre of Myuryunsky Rural Okrug to which the same three settlements are subordinated. Its population as of the 2010 Census was 5,222, down from 5,458 recorded during the 2002 Census.

References

Notes

Sources
Official website of the Sakha Republic. Registry of the Administrative-Territorial Divisions of the Sakha Republic. Ust-Aldansky District. 

Rural localities in Ust-Aldansky District